Dave Parris (born 1 March 1945)  is a former British heavyweight boxer, who is now a referee and judge, based in Woodlesford, Leeds.

References

External links
 
 Dave Parris Profile at BritishBoxing.net

1945 births
Living people
People from Tottenham
English male boxers
Heavyweight boxers
British boxing referees
Boxers from Greater London